Ab Jahan (also Romanized as Āb Jahān and Āb-e Jahān; also known as Ab-e Sahān) is a village in Dowlatkhaneh Rural District, Bajgiran District, Quchan County, Razavi Khorasan Province, Iran. At the 2006 census, its population was 388, in 113 families.

See also 

 List of cities, towns and villages in Razavi Khorasan Province

References 

Populated places in Quchan County